Truett McConnell University is a private Baptist university in Cleveland, Georgia. It is operated under the auspices of the Georgia Baptist Convention and controlled by a board of trustees elected by the convention.  The university was named to honor George W. Truett and Fernando C. McConnell.

History
On July 23, 1946, the Georgia Baptist Convention held ceremonies at Cleveland, Georgia, to mark the establishment of a new two-year liberal arts college named for Truett and McConnell. Truett-McConnell College, operating in temporary quarters on or near the town square in Cleveland, first opened in September 1947, when it enrolled a class of 55 students. The school was first accredited in 1966 to issue two year degrees. In December 2002, the institution was approved by the Southern Association of Colleges and Schools to offer four-year degrees.

In the fall of 2003, a Bachelor of Arts in music and a Bachelor of Arts in music with a concentration in church music degree program was added, which was followed by the December 2005 approval for a Bachelor of Arts in Christian Studies and a Bachelor of Science in education with a concentration in early childhood education. Truett McConnell University offers thirteen bachelor's degrees with various concentrations in the fields of Business, Christian Studies, English, Education, History, Humanities, Music, and Science.  The most recent degree to be approved by SACS is the Bachelor of Arts in World Missions, now referred to as Bachelor of Arts in Global Studies. In the spring of 2010, Truett-McConnell College received approval from SACS to offer online degrees in Business and Christian Studies.

Enrollment declined from 2033 in 2000 to 468 in 2008 (due to the closure of its satellite campuses); then the trend was reversed. In fall of 2010, the school saw its largest enrollment of 751 students, increasing its enrollment by 62% since 2008. In Fall of 2010, Truett-McConnell College announced a new building project, the largest building project in 40 years. It included additions to the Miller Building, a new dorm that would sleep 173 students, as well as an addition to the current dining hall. Ground breaking began late 2010 and construction started in early 2011. The current enrollment is over 2100 students, including residents, commuters, online, and ACCEL students. The administration broke ground in 2015 on the site of the new Student Recreation Center, set for completion in 2016. Following this project, a new chapel and fine arts facility will be underway as well as a new academic building.

On May 14, 2016, Truett-McConnell College achieved university status to become Truett McConnell University.

Athletics

The Truett McConnell (TMU) athletic teams are called the Bears. The university is a member of the National Association of Intercollegiate Athletics (NAIA), primarily competing in the Appalachian Athletic Conference (AAC) since the 2013–14 academic year. The Bears previously competed in the Southern States Athletic Conference (SSAC; formerly known as Georgia–Alabama–Carolina Conference (GACC) until after the 2003–04 school year) from 2010–11 to 2012–13; as well as an NAIA Independent within the Association of Independent Institutions (AII) during the 2009–10 school year (when the school joined the NAIA).

TMU competes in 22 intercollegiate varsity sports: Men's sports include baseball, basketball, cross country, golf, soccer, tennis, track & field, volleyball and wrestling; while women's sports include basketball, beach volleyball, cross country, golf, lacrosse, soccer, softball, tennis, track & field and volleyball; and life sports inc;ude competitive gaming, cycling and shooting sports.

Nickname
The initial nickname of TMU's athletic teams, "The Mountaineers," was changed to "Danes" in 1965, and is now the "Bears".

Notable alumni

References

External links
 
 Official athletics website

 

 
Universities and colleges accredited by the Southern Association of Colleges and Schools
Educational institutions established in 1946
Buildings and structures in White County, Georgia
1946 establishments in Georgia (U.S. state)
Private universities and colleges in Georgia (U.S. state)